Neil Reynolds (1940 – May 19, 2013) was a Canadian journalist, editor and former leader of the Libertarian Party of Canada.

Career in journalism
Born in Kingston, Ontario in 1940, Reynolds dropped out of high school and became a journalist.

After working as a journalist at the Sarnia Observer and the London Free Press he became city editor of the Toronto Star, leaving in 1974 to join the Kingston Whig-Standard, becoming its editor-in-chief in 1978.

Reynolds left Kingston to become editor-in-chief of the New Brunswick Telegraph-Journal and Saint John Times-Globe in 1992. He was hired by Conrad Black as editor-in-chief of the Ottawa Citizen in 1996 and remained there until 2000 when he became editor-in-chief at the Vancouver Sun until 2003.

He then moved to back Ottawa, Ontario and in 2007, he and his wife, Donna, bought Diplomat & International Canada, a magazine published in Ottawa.  In September 2009, he became editor-at-Large of three daily newspapers owned by Brunswick News Inc, including the Telegraph-Journal and its two sister publications, the Times & Transcript and The Daily Gleaner. Reynolds ended his career as a columnist for the Report on Business section of The Globe and Mail, submitting what would be his final column in the summer of 2012.

Politics

Although he had been a supporter of the New Democratic Party in earlier years, he entered politics as the Libertarian Party of Canada's candidate in the 1982 by-election in the riding of Leeds–Grenville. He won 13.4% of the vote, which was the highest percentage vote ever garnered by a Libertarian Party of Canada candidate, either then or since. In May 1982, he became the party's leader, but resigned in 1983 in order to return to his post as Editor of the Kingston Whig-Standard.

Personal life

Reynolds' widow, Donna Jacobs, is an Ottawa-based freelance feature writer and columnist. He died on May 19, 2013, of cancer at the age of 72, leaving his wife, three children, and grandchildren.

References

External links
 Black's New Look Ottawa Citizen 1997 Maclean's feature concentrates on Reynolds and his career.
 Neil Reynolds Remembered An article from JSource that looks at Neil Reynolds career and his impact on Canadian journalism
 Neil Reynolds' Columns The Globe and Mail

  

Canadian newspaper editors
Canadian male journalists
Libertarian Party of Canada leaders
1940 births
2013 deaths
The Globe and Mail people
Ontario candidates for Member of Parliament
Libertarian Party of Canada candidates for the Canadian House of Commons
The Globe and Mail columnists
Libertarian Party of Canada politicians
Canadian libertarians